Dinarvand may refer to:

Dinarvand-e Olya
Dinarvand-e Sofla